The Yamaha YSR50 is a miniature motorcycle that was produced and sold by Yamaha during the late 1980s and early 1990s. The bike featured an air-cooled  two-stroke engine. The engine was sometimes swapped out for a larger variety.

Its first production year was 1986, and it was last made in 1992.

History 
The first production model came out in Japan of 1986, and had the looks of a re-shaped and scaled down version of the YZR 500. It had a front disk brake and a rear drum brake.

The motorcycle also had a 5 speed transmission, the US had a very hard time considering the Motorcycle as a Moped because of the 5 speed transmission.

References

External links
Yamaha YSR 50–80 – Nostalgic Sports Bikes
Team Calamari

Yamaha motorcycles
Minibikes
Motorcycles introduced in 1987
Two-stroke motorcycles